Palace steamers were luxurious steamships that carried passengers and cargo around the North American Great Lakes from 1844 through 1857.  One was the Niagara, which was destroyed by a fire during an 1856 voyage.

Sources 
University of Wisconsin Sea Grant Institute website

Ship types
Passenger ships of the Great Lakes
Steamships